Gabriel Beranger (1725–1817) was a Dutch artist, known for his works showing Irish antiquities.

Life
Beranger was born in Rotterdam on 9 March 1725, as the son of Henry Beranger and Marie le Duc/Anne Marie Leduc. His parents, who had married in Rotterdam in 1713, were both of Huguenot origin. In 1760, Beranger went to Ireland to join family members there.

Beranger opened a print shop and artist's warehouse at 5 South Great George's Street, Dublin, and followed the profession of an artist. Charles Vallancey and William Conyngham became his patrons and found him a government situation in the Dublin exchequer office.

In later life Beranger was financially independent, after a bequest from his brother-in-law. He died at the age of 91 or 92, and was interred in the French burial-ground in Dublin.

Works

Beranger drew the antiquities of Dublin and its neighbourhood, and then, with the French artist Angelo Bigari, sketching tours through Leinster, Connaught, and Ulster. Many of his drawings are accompanied by descriptions of the places and people he visited. He transferred his drawings and descriptions to manuscript volumes intended for publication, most of which were kept in Dublin, in the Royal Irish Academy and elsewhere. The drawings give the appearance of ancient buildings and stone monuments that later deteriorated or were destroyed. George Petrie made use of these drawings to illustrate his book on the round towers of Ireland.

External links
 William Robert Wilde, Memoir of Gabriel Beranger: And His Labours in the Cause of Irish Art and Antiquities, from 1760 to 1780 (1880)
 Beranger Watercolours in University College Dublin Library. A UCD Digital Library Collection

Notes

Attribution

1725 births
1817 deaths
18th-century Dutch painters
18th-century Dutch male artists
Dutch male painters
18th-century Irish painters
Irish male painters
Dutch watercolourists
Painters from Rotterdam